Humble is a city located in the Houston metropolitan area. Humble became an oil boomtown in the early 20th century when oil was first discovered there in 1904. By 1905, the Humble oilfield was the largest producing oilfield in Texas. Humble was home of The Humble Oil and Refining Company, a predecessor of Exxon.

As of the 2020 census, the city population was 16,795.

History 

The first settlers began moving into the Humble area in the early 19th century. Joseph Dunman is believed to be the first settler in 1828. A ferry was built nearby, across the San Jacinto River. The area of Humble became a center for commercial activity due to the region's large oil industry.

The city got its name from one of the original founders/settlers, Pleasant Smith Humble, who opened the first post office in his home and later served as justice of the peace. In 1883, a city directory reported that he operated a fruit stand. In 1885, he was a wood dealer, and in 1900, the District 99, Justice Pct. 4, Harris Co., Texas Census reported his occupation as attorney at law.

Humble became an oil boomtown in the early 1900 when oil was first produced there. The first oil was produced a couple years after the famous Spindletop discovery in Beaumont, Texas. Railroad linkage was established in 1904, and shortly thereafter the first tank car of oil was shipped out of Humble's oil field. By 
1905 the Humble oilfield was the biggest producing field in Texas. The town was the home of the Humble Oil & Refining Company, founded in 1911, a predecessor of Exxon. When the oil boom receded, many land owners returned to truck farming, dairy farming and the timber industry.

Humble remained a rather small, quiet city until the opening of the Houston Intercontinental Airport in 1969.

Humble City Council passed, by a 5-1 vote, a public smoking ban on that took effect on March 6, 2012.

Geography 

Humble is located at  (29.994920, –95.264873).

Downtown Humble is located on a salt dome. Most of the petroleum production is shallow and encircles the city by about a  radius.

Climate

The climate in this area is characterized by hot, humid summers and generally mild to cool winters.  According to the Köppen Climate Classification system, Humble has a humid subtropical climate, abbreviated "Cfa" on climate maps.

Demographics 

As of the 2020 United States census, there were 16,795 people, 6,373 households, and 3,411 families residing in the city.

As of the census of 2000, there were 14,579 people, 5,460 households, and 3,652 families residing in the city. The population density was 1,477.5 people per square mile (570.3/km2). There were 5,908 housing units at an average density of 598.7 per square mile (231.1/km2). The racial makeup of the city was 69.24% White, 14.49% African American, 0.68% Native American, 3.22% Asian, 0.26% Pacific Islander, 9.07% from other races, and 3.04% from two or more races. Hispanic or Latino of any race were 23.36% of the population.

There were 5,460 households, out of which 37.0% had children under the age of 18 living with them, 44.6% were married couples living together, 16.8% had a female householder with no husband present, and 33.1% were non-families. 26.3% of all households were made up of individuals, and 5.9% had someone living alone who was 65 years of age or older. The average household size was 2.62 and the average family size was 3.18.

In the city the population was spread out, with 28.0% under the age of 18, 12.3% from 18 to 24, 31.8% from 25 to 44, 19.4% from 45 to 64, and 8.5% who were 65 years of age or older. The median age was 30 years. For every 100 females, there were 96.1 males. For every 100 females age 18 and over, there were 91.4 males.

The median income for a household in the city was $37,834, and the median income for a family was $46,399. Males had a median income of $34,434 versus $26,988 for females. The per capita income for the city was $17,678. About 12.2% of families and 15.5% of the population were below the poverty line, including 22.2% of those under age 18 and 7.4% of those age 65 or over.

CityData.com states that the crime rates for Humble were higher than the average United States crime rate. The average crime rate for cities with under 30,000 people was 294.7; Humble's crime rate was at 593.7.

Economy
Petroleum has been the basis of Humble's economy since its beginning. The city was the namesake for Humble Oil and Refining Company, which later merged with the Exxon corporation.

Arts and culture

Museums and other points of interest

Humble Negro Cemetery
Humble Museum, 601 Higgins Street
DeLorean Motor Company (DMC), manufacturer of the DeLorean, a sports car made famous by the movie Back to the Future, has its only remaining private factory based in Humble.

Parks and recreation
The Shell Houston Open, an annual PGA Tour event is played at Golf Club of Houston, located in an unincorporated area near Humble. The event takes place at the end of March-beginning of April. The event has historically been one week before the Masters Tournament, the season's first major.

Government

County, state, and federal representation 
Harris County operates a tax office at 7900 Will Clayton Parkway in Humble.

The U.S. Postal Service operates the Humble Post Office. Some locations in the City of Houston have Humble mailing addresses.

Education

Primary and secondary schools 

The majority of the city of Humble is served by the Humble Independent School District.

The city of Humble has three public elementary schools:
 Humble Elementary School
 Jack M. Fields, Senior Elementary School
 Lakeland Elementary School
Humble is served by Ross Sterling Middle School (formerly by Humble Middle School), and Humble High School.

All students attending the Humble Independent School District have the option to apply to Guy M. Sconzo Early College, a magnet high school that as of the 2016–2017 school year is contained within but separated from Humble High School.

A portion of the city limits is within the Aldine Independent School District (AISD). AISD built Marine D. Jones Middle School (initially named Townsen Boulevard Middle School) in the Humble city limits.

A Catholic K–8, St. Mary Magdalene School, is in Humble. The closest Catholic high school is Frassati Catholic High School in north Harris County; the planners of the school intended for it to serve Humble. Holy Trinity Episcopal School, a Christian PK–5 school, is in Harris County, in proximity to Humble. Christian Life Center Academy, a private school, was in a section of the city of Houston, near Humble, while having an Humble postal address. It is now in the Kingwood area of Houston.

Community colleges

Lone Star College System (formerly the North Harris Montgomery Community College District) serves the area. In 1972, residents of Humble ISD and two other K–12 school districts voted to create the North Harris County College District. The community college district began operations in the Harris County/Montgomery County's northern hemisphere in the fall of 1973. The Humble area is currently served by Lone Star College, Kingwood which operates the Humble Center for outreach.

Public libraries

The Harris County Public Library Octavia Fields Branch Library is located at 1503 South Houston Avenue in Humble. Humble's first public library opened in 1921 with the books stored in the high school. In 1923 the library was split between the Humble High School and the Woodward School at Moonshine Hill. In 1926 the library moved to a church. In 1928 the library moved into the then-new Humble courthouse. In the early 1930s the library moved to city hall. In 1932 the city hall courtroom became a reading room. In the early 1960s a man named Tom Shelton donated a house and lot at the intersection of First Street and Avenue D. The house was remodeled and opened as the Shelton Memorial Library. On October 9, 1969 the library moved to 111 West Higgins Street. It received the name Octavia Fields Memorial Library from Octavia Fields, the grandmother of Jack Fields, a former Congress member. The current  branch opened on June 27, 2001.

Some areas outside of Humble with Humble, TX postal addresses are in proximity to the Baldwin Boettcher Branch Library at Mercer Park. The  branch opened in 1986. It was constructed on donated land. It was named after Baldwin Boettcher, a German settler. His descendants deeded the homestead to Harris County. The plans stated that the Boettcher staff would assist the Mercer Park staff in finding any botanical reference books that they or the public need.

Media
Humble news is covered by three community newspapers: Community Impact Newspaper Lake Houston/Humble/Kingwood edition, The Tribune Newspaper and The Observer Newspaper. Community Impact Newspaper is owned by John and Jennifer Garrett and covers several Houston Metro suburban areas as well as Austin and DFW Metro markets. The Tribune is locally owned and operated by Cynthia Calvert and Larry Shiflet. The Observer is owned by the Hearst Publications. It is also the business location of Christian Radio Station KSBJ, call sign 89.3 FM radio.

Houston Chronicle is the metrowide paper.

Infrastructure

Health care
Harris County Hospital District operates the E. A. "Squatty" Lyons Health Center in Humble. The clinic opened in 1991, replacing a clinic in Bordersville. The nearest public hospital is Lyndon B. Johnson Hospital in northeast Houston.

Humble Surgical Hospital is a multi-specialty, physician-owned surgical hospital. Humble Surgical Hospital opened in 2010.

Postal service 
The United States Postal Service Humble Post Office is located at 1202 1st Street East. The Foxbrook Finance Unit is located near Humble in an unincorporated area; On Monday May 10, 2008, the Foxbrook post office was dedicated as the "Texas Military Veterans Post Office" in a ceremony hosted by U.S. Congressperson Ted Poe.

Prison system
Pam Lychner State Jail, a Texas Department of Criminal Justice state jail for men, is located in Atascocita in unincorporated northeast Harris County, east of Humble. The state jail was named after Pam Lychner.

Notable people 

 Jackie Battle, American football player
 Bertrand Berry, American football player
 Sam Cosmi, American football player
 The Grappler, professional wrestler
 Alberto Gonzales, 80th United States Attorney General
 Dan Huberty, Republican member of the Texas House of Representatives from Humble since 2011
 Howard Hughes, entrepreneur, aerospace engineer, filmmaker, inventor, investor, aviator, philanthropist
 Jerrod Johnson, American football player
 Wakaichiro Ken, sumo wrestler
 David Kersh, country singer
  Hailey Kilgore, actress and singer
 David Meece, Christian musician

Literary references
Humble is the site of a Confederate concentration camp in Harry Turtledove's alternate history novel Settling Accounts: In at the Death.

Gallery

References

External links
 

 
 History of Humble
 Handbook of Texas Online article
 ePodunk: Profile for Humble, Texas
 City-Data/com

Greater Houston
Cities in Harris County, Texas
Company towns in Texas
Populated places established in 1933
1933 establishments in Texas
Cities in Texas